The 11th arrondissement of Marseille is one of the 16 arrondissements of Marseille. It is governed locally together with the 12th arrondissement, with which it forms the 6th sector of Marseille.

Population

References

External links
 Official website
 Dossier complet, INSEE

 
Arrondissements of Marseille